Peter Hermann Stebler (7 May 1927 – 15 September 2010) was a Swiss rower who competed in the 1948 Summer Olympics and in the 1952 Summer Olympics. He was born in Zürich. In 1948 he was a crew member of the Swiss boat which won the silver medal in the coxed four event. Four years later he was eliminated with his partner Émile Knecht in the first round repêchage of the double sculls event.

References

1927 births
2010 deaths
Swiss male rowers
Olympic rowers of Switzerland
Rowers at the 1948 Summer Olympics
Rowers at the 1952 Summer Olympics
Olympic silver medalists for Switzerland
Olympic medalists in rowing
Medalists at the 1948 Summer Olympics
European Rowing Championships medalists
Rowers from Zürich